"Broken" is the second single from Kate Ryan's album, Electroshock. It was in Belgium on iTunes on 7 October 2011. The song is written By Anders Hansson, Kate Ryan, Negin Djafari, Bernard Ansong and was produced by Anders Hansson, Felix Persson and Märta Grauers with additional production of Andras Vleminckx & Jérôme "Deekly" Riouffreyt. The song features vocals from Narcz Privé a.k.a. Narco.

On 27 June 2012, as a celebration of the release of the album, Ryan shared via her Facebook page the original version of the song, which does not include Narco's vocals. This version is now available on Kate Ryan's SoundCloud page.

Track listing
 Digital download - Single
 "Broken" (feat. Narco) - 3:30
 Digital Remixes EP 
 "Broken" (Eightysix & Deekly Radio Edit) - 3:46
 "Broken" (Jellow's Funkster Remix) - 3:18
 "Broken" (Nicolaz 4AM Living Room Remix) - 5:38
 "Broken" (AMRO's Touch Remix) - 6:52
 "Broken" (Dany Otton Iberian Remix) - 3:50

Chart performance

Release history

References

External links

Kate Ryan songs
2011 singles
Songs written by Kate Ryan
2011 songs
Songs written by Anders Hansson (songwriter)
Songs written by Negin Djafari